Lake Superior and Ishpeming Railroad No. 23 is a preserved SC-4 class 2-8-0 "consolidation" type steam locomotive originally built by the ALCO in January 1910 for the Lake Superior and Ishpeming Railroad as No. 9. It was renumbered 23 in 1923. It was used for pulling carloads of iron ore, as well as some passenger trains on branch lines, until 1962. In 1963, it was leased to the Marquette and Huron Mountain tourist railroad for use in excursion service between Marquette and Big Bay, until 1974. It was the locomotive that had the longest operating career on the M&HM. After the M&HM was shut down in 1984, No. 23 was sold off to the Empire State Railway Museum in Phoenicia, New York, where it remained as a display piece until 2002. That same year, ESRM announced that they would restore the locomotive to operating condition, and they began the rebuilding process at the Catskill Mountain Railroad's Kingston yard site. As of 2023, No. 23 is still undergoing restoration.

History

Original service life 
In the early 20th century, the Lake Superior and Ishpeming Railroad (LS&I) needed locomotives to pull passenger and iron ore trains between West Ishpeming and Marquette. In 1909, to replace their aging fleet of A3 class 0-6-0s, the railroad designed and ordered five small 2-8-0 "consolidation" type locomotives from the American Locomotive Company’s (ALCO) former Pittsburgh Locomotive Works in Pittsburgh, Pennsylvania, and they were delivered the following year, being numbered 9–13. No. 23 was numbered 9 at the time and was the very first locomotive of its class. The railroad expected these consolidations to meet their demand for more power, as the freight traffic was getting heavier for them. However, No. 9 and its class mates never met their expectations, because they had multiple problems that nearly plagued them; they had smaller boilers than the slightly older B-4 class locomotive, and they were only capable of less than 35,000 pounds of tractive effort. Their fireboxes were also narrow with a low grate area, since they were tucked in between the rear set of driving wheels. Without a wide enough firebox area to create enough steam, the little consolidations were deemed poor performers compared to their predecessors. They had a bad habit of stalling on grades or giving up when the trains they pulled grew longer, so railroaders often flew curses at them. The gear motion was also looked at as a set of counter gyrations, which earned these locomotives the nickname "Monkie Motions". After a few years of disappointing performance, No. 9 and its classmates were reassigned to pull light mixed trains, as stand-by locomotives when there was power needed for extra ore trains, or use as dock switchers.

In 1923, the LS&I received some additional locomotives, including three more "Monkie Motions", after purchasing the Munising, Marquette and Southeastern Railway (MM&SE). No. 9 and its classmates were reclassified as SC-4s and were renumbered 18–25, and No. 9 was renumbered 23, with the number 9 being given to an 1896-built 2-8-0. Between 1928 and 1934, all the SC-4s, with the exception of No. 25, were sent to the railroad's new facility in Presque Isle and completely rebuilt to decrease the amount of problems that nearly plagued them, and No. 23 was the very first one to be rebuilt. Their boilers were raised, their fireboxes were widened to increate the grate area, they received new super heater cylinders with cylinder saddles, feedwater heater systems for the smokeboxes, and thermic syphons for the fireboxes, their Baker pilliod motions were replaced with Walschaerts motions, their smoke stacks shortened by a few inches, they received staircases on their pilot decks in a "V" shape, and their domes and bells swapped places. These modifications have vastly improved their performances and efficiency compared to their original designs. As the 1930s progressed, No. 23 was offered the name "Philip Smith", the name of an engineer who used to work on the LS&I Princeton-Munising division. The SC-4s resumed to pull mixed freight trains on the LS&I's mainline between West Ishpeming, Marquette, and Negaunee, during the ore seasons, until the LS&I completed Dieselisation by the end of 1962. By that time, No. 23 was stored as an emergency backup locomotive.

Preservation 
Between 1962 and 1963, the railroad sold eleven of their 2-8-0s, as well as some of their passenger cars, to the Marquette and Huron Mountain Railroad(M&HM), a Tourist Railroad founded by retired LS&I employee John A. Zerbal. The rails that the M&HM ran on were the LS&I's abandoned "Big Bay Division", which lied between the Presque Isle depot in Marquette and the Big Bay depot in Big Bay. The line ran 24 miles with the official count at 25.07 miles long. Mr. Zerbal had plans to operate all of the locomotives he had purchased on the line to help provide intensive services at a resort complex he had planned to serve. However, only three SC-4s ever operated on the M&HM. Numbers 19 and 22 only operated on the M&HM for three years, and only No. 23 operated on the M&HM for the longest time period, and it ended up being the main flagship of the railroad. The M&HM was popular with rail fans, but they were too far from a large population to meet their demand for a huge amount of money from visitors. Thus, the future plans for the resort at Big Bay never materialized, and due to a lack of funds to keep their steam locomotives operable, Numbers 19, 22, and 23 were all taken out of service in 1965. While No. 23 sat in a sideline in front of the Presque Isle depot, pending for an overhaul, 19 and 22 joined the rest the M&HM's 2-8-0s in storage in the form of a scrapline, but were held for preservation. The M&HM acquired GE 70-ton diesel switcher Calumet and Hecla No. 210 for cheaper operational costs to keep up the excursion runs and to raise enough money to overhaul No. 23. No. 23 was brought back into M&HM service in 1973, and during that time, it was given a repaint to make the railroad look nicer in motive power. By that time, however, the M&HM's twenty-five-mile trackage lost ten miles.

In 1984, Mr. Zerbal passed away, and with him out of the picture, the M&HM wouldn't last any longer. Ownership of all the 2-8-0s in Marquette was reverted to the LS&I, who sold off almost all of them at auction to pay debts of the estate. The rest of the M&HM was abandoned and eventually ripped up. No. 23 was sold to the Empire State Railway Museum (ESRM), who moved the locomotive to their property in Phoenicia, New York in 1985. No. 23 received a partial cosmetic restoration to be placed on static display just outside the Catskill Mountain Railroad (CMR)'s depot. In 2002, the ESRM made considerations about restoring No. 23 to operating condition for use on the CMR, and beginning in the summer 2003, the locomotive was moved to the CMR’s storage yard in Kingston, where it was stripped to the boiler shell and running gear. Ultrasound testing was completed with good results, and repairs to the firebox, as well as the tender, began. In 2007, the restoration on No. 23 was estimated to be completed in 2010 for the locomotive's 100th birthday. However, those plans fell through, due to a lack of volunteers. In the spring 2016, the CMR was ordered to vacate their yard in Kingston, and No. 23 was consequently moved next to the CMR's depot for temporary storage while the ESRM constructed a two-stall car barn to proceed the restoration process indoors. In the summer of that same year, No. 23 was pushed inside the finished building safely out of the weather. The number plate, headlight, and whistle have been cosmetically restored and put on display inside the museum since May 2020, and the restoration project has slowed down since the Coronavirus Pandemic from early 2020. The cab, the smokebox door, the smoke stack, the steam dome, and parts of the running boards have been repainted and reinstalled on the locomotive. The headlight was also returned to the smokebox. However, the ESRM has stated that once restoration work on No. 23 is completed, it will not be able to operate under their stewardship, due to the museum’s lack of volunteers and funds.

See also 

 Lake Superior and Ishpeming 18
 Arcade & Attica 18
New Hope Railroad 40
Chicago and North Western 175

External links 
 Empire State Railway Museum Official Website

References 

2-8-0 locomotives
Railway locomotives introduced in 1910
Standard gauge locomotives of the United States
Individual locomotives of the United States
Freight locomotives
Standard gauge steam locomotives
Lake Superior and Ishpeming locomotives
Preserved steam locomotives of New York